Hasan Ali (also spelled Hassan Ali) can refer to:

Hasan Ali (Kara Koyunlu), last ruler of the Kara Koyunlu Turkmen tribal federation
Hasan Ali (cricketer), Pakistani cricketer
Hasan Ali (footballer), United Arab Emirates footballer
Hasan ibn Ali, grandson of the Islamic prophet Muhammad
Hasan Ali Khan, Indian businessman
Hassan Ali Mehran (born 1937), Iranian economist
Hasan Mohamed Ali, Malaysian politician
Kamal Hassan Ali, Egyptian politician
 Hassan Ali (kabaddi), Pakistani kabaddi player

Geography
Hasan Ali, Iran, a village in South Khorasan Province, Iran
Qal'eh Hasan Ali, volcanic field in Iran